Augustin Ujka is a retired Albanian professional football who played for KF Laçi in Albania, NK Mladost 127 in Croatia and FC Chiasso in Switzerland.

References

Year of birth missing (living people)
Living people
Association football defenders
Albanian footballers
KF Laçi players
HNK Suhopolje players
FC Chiasso players
Kategoria e Parë players
Kategoria Superiore players
Albanian expatriate footballers
Expatriate footballers in Croatia
Albanian expatriate sportspeople in Croatia
Expatriate footballers in Switzerland
Albanian expatriate sportspeople in Switzerland